Rhinosimus is a genus of narrow-waisted bark beetles, usually recognized by the long rostrum on the head of an adult beetle.

External links
 Probert Encyclopedia
 Integrated Taxonomic Information System
 Bug Guide

Tenebrionoidea genera
Salpingidae